In mathematics, Borel's lemma, named after Émile Borel, is an important result used in the theory of asymptotic expansions and partial differential equations.

Statement
Suppose U is an open set in the Euclidean space Rn, and suppose that f0, f1, ... is a sequence of smooth functions on U.

If I is any open interval in R containing 0 (possibly I = R), then there exists a smooth function F(t, x) defined on I×U, such that

for k ≥ 0 and x in U.

Proof

Note that it suffices to prove the result for a small interval I = (−ε,ε), since if ψ(t) is a smooth bump function with compact support in (−ε,ε) equal identically to 1 near 0, then ψ(t) ⋅ F(t, x) gives a solution on R × U. Similarly using a smooth partition of unity on Rn subordinate to a covering by open balls with centres at δ⋅Zn, it can be assumed that all the fm have compact support in some fixed closed ball C. For each m, let

where εm is chosen sufficiently small that

for |α| < m. These estimates imply that each sum

is uniformly convergent and hence that

is a smooth function with

By construction

Note: Exactly the same construction can be applied, without the auxiliary space U, to produce a smooth function on the interval I for which the derivatives at 0 form an arbitrary sequence.

See also

References

 

Partial differential equations
Lemmas in analysis
Asymptotic analysis